Pav bhaji (Marathi : पाव भाजी) is a fast food dish from India consisting of a thick vegetable curry (bhaji) served with a soft bread roll (pav). It originated in the city of Mumbai.

History 
The dish originated as a fast lunchtime dish for textile mill workers in Mumbai. Pav bhaji was later served at restaurants throughout the city. Pav bhaji is now offered at outlets from simple hand carts to formal restaurants in India and abroad.

Preparation 

Pav bhaji is a spiced mixture of mashed vegetables in a thick gravy served with bread. Vegetables in the curry may commonly include potatoes, onions, carrots, chillies, peas, bell peppers and tomatoes. Street sellers usually cook the curry on a flat griddle (tava) and serve the dish hot. A soft white bread roll is the usual accompaniment to the curry, but this does not preclude the use of other bread varieties such as chapati, roti or brown bread.

Variants 
Variations on pav bhaji include:
 Cheese pav bhaji, with cheese on top of the bhaji
 Fried pav bhaji, with the pav tossed in the bhaji
 Paneer pav bhaji, with paneer cheese in the bhaji
 Mushroom pav bhaji, with mushrooms in the bhaji
 Khada pav bhaji, with vegetable chunks in the bhaji
 Jain pav bhaji, without onions and garlic and with plantains instead of potatoes
 Kolhapuri pav bhaji, using a spice mix common in Kolhapur

References 

Street food
Indian fast food
Maharashtrian cuisine
Curry dishes
Spicy foods
Chili pepper dishes
Indian cuisine